Sergent André Robert Lévy was a French World War I flying ace credited with six aerial victories.

Early life

André Robert Lévy was born in Paris, France, on 6 June 1893. He was mobilized for infantry duty at the start of World War I, on 2 September 1914.

Military service

André Robert Lévy transferred to aviation on 8 October 1916. He qualified as a pilot on 4 March 1917. He was initially assigned to fly a Farman for Escadrille 29. However, he flew a Sopwith Aviation Company Sopwi 1.A2 for his first victory on 7 April 1917. On 16 May, he was then reassigned, to the only French air squadron on the Italian Front, Escadrille 561, which was tasked with air defense of Venice. Using a mixture of Nieuport and Spad fighters emblazoned with a dogs-head insignia, Lévy scored his second win on 21 June 1918, scored a double on 20 July, and became an ace on 5 August. On 16 September, he became a balloon buster, destroying an Austro-Hungarian observation balloon and being shot down in the process. With the engine dead from a fuel line severed by anti-aircraft fire, Lévy purposely landed hard, bending the landing gear, and inverting his Spad XIII. He was then taken away to prison camp in Mulbach. On his second attempt at escape, on 2 November, Lévy escaped through a mountainous wilderness smothered under 30 inches of snow. He made it back to his unit on 6 November 1918.

Later life
André Robert Lévy was released from military duty on 3 September 1919, with the rank of Sergeant. He died upon 12 March 1973.

Sources of information

References
 Over The Front: The Complete Record of the Fighter Aces and Units of the United States and French Air Services, 1914-1918 . Norman Franks, Frank Bailey. Grub Street Publishing, 2008.  
 SPAD XII/XIII aces of World War I. Jon Guttman. Osprey Publishing, 2002. , .

1893 births
1973 deaths
French World War I flying aces